Arno Rafael Minkkinen (born 4 June 1945) is a Finnish-American photographer who works in the United States.
 
Published and exhibited worldwide, Minkkinen's work can be found in the collections of the Museum of Fine Arts, Boston and the Finnish Museum of Photography.
 
Seven solo monographs on his work have been published: Frostbite (1978), Waterline (1994, winner of the 25th Rencontres d'Arles Book Prize), Body Land (1999), SAGA: The Journey of Arno Rafael Minkkinen, 35 Years of Photographs (2005), Homework: The Finnish Photographs (2008), Swimming in the Air (2009), and Balanced Equation (2010). The retrospective survey SAGA premiered at the DeCordova Museum in Lincoln, MA, in 2005. The 120-print retrospective toured to Romania, Slovakia, Finland, Italy, China, and Canada.
 
Minkkinen was made a Knight of the Order of the Lion of Finland of the first class by the Finnish government in 1992, and awarded the Finnish State Art Prize in Photography in 2006.

Early life and education
Minkkinen was born in Helsinki, Finland in 1945 and emigrated to the United States in 1951. He graduated from Wagner College with a Bachelor of Arts in English Literature, and  began taking self-portraits in 1971, while working as an advertising copywriter on Madison Avenue in New York. He later studied with Harry Callahan and Aaron Siskind at Rhode Island School of Design and earned his Master of Fine Arts degree in photography in 1974.

Career
Over the past four decades, Minkkinen has been engaged as a teacher, curator, and writer while continuing to devote his photographic research and energies to the self-portrait.

Teaching activities
 
Minkkinen is a professor of art at the University of Massachusetts Lowell, and also serves as lecturer at Aalto University of Art & Design Helsinki. Earlier in his teaching career he served as assistant professor at M.I.T., Visiting Artist at Philadelphia College of Art (now University of the Arts (Philadelphia)), the École d'Arts Appliqués in Vevey, Switzerland, and as graduate faculty at Maine Media College in Rockport, Maine.
 
Since joining UMass Lowell in 1987, Minkkinen has taken students to Finland and Russia (1988), and Czechoslovakia (1989). In 1996, in a collaborative UMass Lowell/Lahti Institute of Design (Lahti, Finland) exchange program called Spirit Level, thirty Finnish, American, and Swiss students toured through Finland, Russia, and Eastern Europe for three weeks with Minkkinen and photo department head at Lahti, Timo Laaksonen. Among the students at the time was Mark Eshbaugh who later became an adjunct professor at UMass Lowell. Seven years after the first Spirit Level, together with Timo Laaksonen and Mark Eshbaugh a professor at Umass Lowell at that time, Tuscany in Italy (2003) and Oaxaca, Mexico (2007) were added to the program. Later Minkinnen organized collaborations with Aalto University in Helsinki, Finland and the Foundation Studio Marangoni in Florence, Italy (2010) as well as the Bilder Nordic School of Photography in Oslo and the École Supérieure d'Arts & Medias de Caen/Cherbourg in France (2012) for an American Road Trip to the studio farmlands of American photographer Sally Mann. The first three workshops resulted in the publication of a book commemorating those first three experiences.
 
Minkkinen has taught workshops worldwide, particularly at the Maine Photographic Workshops (now Maine Media Workshops), Maine Media College (as part of the graduate faculty), the Art Institute of Boston at Lesley University, Anderson Ranch in Colorado, Santa Fe Workshops in New Mexico, the Friends of Photography in Carmel, California, and in Europe at the Rencontres d'Arles in Arles, France, the Toscana Photographic Workshops in Tuscany, Italy, as well as workshop programs in Finland, Norway, Luxembourg, and China. Minkkinen served a second four-year term as national board member of the Society of Photographic Education (2008 to 2016).

Recent work
 
Since 2009, Minkkinen has developed a growing interest in feature filmmaking and screenwriting. In 2010, he received a first round of support from the Finnish Film Foundation for a screenplay he had written and will be directing. Filming was planned in Finnish Karelia and Finntown, Brooklyn. The demo preview of The Rain House was screened at the Film Society of Lincoln Center's Elinor Bunin Munroe Film Center in connection with the Dance Films Association's 41st Dance on Camera Festival (2013). As of 2021 the film was in the making.

Publications

Monographs and curated anthologies
Frostbite. Morgan & Morgan, Dobbs Ferry, New York. .
New American Nudes: Recent Trends & Attitudes. Morgan & Morgan, Dobbs Ferry, NY. MIT Creative Photography Gallery.
Elegant Intimacy. Retretti Art Center, Punkaharju, Finland. With J. H. Lartigue and Sally Mann. Also Harry Callahan, Emmet Gowin, Claude Batho, Yves Tremorin, Roman Vishniac, and Alfred Stieglitz.
Waterline. Marval, Paris; Otava, Helsinki; Aperture, New York, 1993. . Grand Prix du Livre, 25th Rencontres d'Arles Photography Festival.
The Waterline Portfolio. Aperture Foundation.
Ten Minutes Past Midnight. Musta Taide, Helsinki, Finland.
Body Land. (Motta, Milan, 1997; Nathan, Paris, 1988), Smithsonian Institution Press, Washington, D.C., 1999. .
SAGA: The Journey of Arno Rafael Minkkinen, Thirty Years of Photographs. Chronicle Books, San Francisco, 2005. . Essay by A. D. Coleman.
Swimming in the Air. Cavallo Point at Golden Gate National Park, San Francisco.
SAGA: The Journey of Arno Rafael Minkkinen. SEE+ Art Space Gallery, Beijing.
Homework / Suomen Kuvat, The Finnish Photographs of Arno Rafael Minkkinen, 1973 to 2008. Like Publishing, Helsinki, 2008. .
Arno Rafael Minkkinen. See+ Art Space Gallery. Beijing, China. 30 postcards in book form.
Balanced Equation. Lodima Press Portfolio Series.

Publications with contributions by Minkkinen
Timo Laaksonen and Arno Rafael Minkkinen. In Spirit of the Masters. Keravan Taidomuseo 2000. . He is co-editor and has images included.

Critical writings, essays and fiction
 Minkkinen, Arno Rafael, Frostbite, Morgan & Morgan, Dobbs Ferry, New York. 1981.
 Minkkinen, Arno Rafael, New American Nudes: Recent Trends & Attitudes, Morgan & Morgan, Dobbs Ferry, New York. 1981.
 Minkkinen, Arno Rafael, "From the Prow." Finnice, Camera International. 1991.
 Minkkinen, Arno Rafael, "The Lens of Love," Elegant Intimacy, Retretti Art Center, Punkaharju, Finland. 1993.
 Minkkinen, Arno Rafael, Waterline Marval (Paris), Aperture (New York), Otava (Helsinki), 1994.
 Minkkinen, Arno Rafael, "Baudelaire's Brow, Reflections on the photographs of Karin Rosenthal. Karin Rosenthal, Danforth Museum of Art, Framingham, Massachusetts. 2000.
 Minkkinen, Arno Rafael, "Take Out My Eyes," In the Spirit of the Masters, Kerava Art Museum, Kerava, Finland, 2000. pp. 66–79.
 Minkkinen, Arno Rafael, "Treasures of the Moment: Thirty years of Polaroid Photography in Boston, Photography in Boston 1955–1985, DeCordova Museum and Sculpture Park, Lincoln, Massachusetts. MIT Press, Cambridge, 2000. Chapter text pp. 135–153.
 Minkkinen, Arno Rafael, "First Frames First." exposure, Society for Photographic Education. Vol. 35. Fall 2001.
 Minkkinen, Arno Rafael. Balanced Equation. Lodima Press, Revere, Pennsylvania, 2010.
 Minkkinen, Arno Rafael. "Faith in Happenstance." American Faith. Photographs by Christopher Churchill. Nazraeli Press, Portland, 2011.
 Minkkinen, Arno Rafael. "The Morning of Childhood." Faces. Photographs by William Ropp. Maison européenne de la photographie, 2011.
 Minkkinen, Arno Rafael. "The Horsepower of Desire." Surrounded by No One. Photographs by Margaret M. de Lange. Trolley Books, London, 2011.

Film and television
 Still Not There. Finnish Public Television, 1996: 52-minute documentary on the life and works of Arno Rafael Minkkinen. Directed by Kimmo Koskela. Finnish Emmy Award entry, 1996.
 Art Close Up: Boston Photography: 1955–1985. WGBH-TV Channel 2 Boston: 7-minute segment on A.R. Minkkinen as part of DeCordova Museum exhibition, Boston Photographers: 1955–1985. Produced, directed by Marty Ostrow. 1999.
 EGG: The Art Show. PBS/ Channel 13, New York. 30-minute segment with Cindy Sherman, Bruce Gilden, Ernest Withers, and Arno Rafael Minkkinen: "Who Am I?" 2000.
 Art Close Up: Photography & Reality. WGBH-TV Channel 2, Boston. Produced by Ben Mayer. 2004.
 Arno Rafael Minkkinen: 40 Years of Self-Portraits. DVD with Still Not There, 2010 interview, and 172- image slideshow produced and directed by Kimmo Koskela.

Awards

 1991 National Endowment for the Arts Regional Fellowship
 1992 Order of the Lion First Class, conferred by the Finnish government
 1994 Grand Prix du Livre, 25th Rencontres d'Arles Photography Festival
 1996 Scritture d'Acqua Prize (given in Literature, Art, & Science), Italy
 1996 Still Not There. Finland's Emmy Award entry
 1997 Still Not There. Prize of Honor. Art Film Triennial, Kalmar, Sweden
 1998 Still Not There. Silver Key, 6th International Art Film Festival. Geraldine Chaplin, juror. Bratislava, Slovak Republic
 2006 Finnish Photographic Arts Council Book Grant
 2006 Lianzhou International Photo Festival Special Jury Prize for SAGA, Lianzhou, China
 2006 Finnish State Art Prize in Photography
 2008 Finnish Film Foundation grant for re-edit of Still Not There
 2010 Finnish Film Foundation Grant for The Rain House Screenplay
 2011 Nancy Donahue Professor of Art Award

Solo exhibitions

Collections
Minkkinen's work is held in the following permanent collections:
 Finnish Museum of Photography
 Museum of Fine Arts, Boston, Massachusetts

References

External links 
 Arno Rafael Minkkinen at Edwynn Houk Gallery, New York
 Video interview with Arno Rafael Minkkinen, 2014
 

 

1945 births
Living people
Finnish photographers
Nude photography
Artists from Helsinki
Recipients of the Order of the Lion of Finland
Finnish emigrants to the United States
University of Massachusetts Lowell faculty